Events from the year 1715 in Russia

Incumbents
 Monarch – Peter I

Events

Births

 Peter II of Russia
 Ekaterina Chernysheva, courtier (died 1779)

Deaths

 
 
 
 
 John of Tobolsk

References

 
Years of the 18th century in Russia